Antoni Kucharczyk (born 2 August 1874 in Bęczyn, Austria-Hungary (now Poland) - 11 May 1944 in Paszkówka) was a Polish poet.

He became well known during 1900 and 1915.

In 1933 he became the president of the Polish Writer's Union of People.

Composer Barbara Maria Zakrzewska-Nikiporczyk used Kucharczyk's text for her composition "Two Religious Songs" in 1981.

References

1874 births
1944 deaths
Polish poets
Austro-Hungarian poets